Golde is a surname. Notable people with the surname include:

Adam Golde (died 1395/6), English politician
Franne Golde, American singer and songwriter
Roger Golde (died 1429), English politician
Silva Golde (1955–2013), Latvian politician and educator

Other uses
 Golde, the wife of Tevye, protagonist of Fiddler on the Roof

See also
Gold (disambiguation)